Parkland is an unincorporated community in the town of Parkland, Douglas County, Wisconsin, United States.

The Canadian National Railway runs through the community.

Education
The Superior School District serves the community, with the Lake Superior Elementary School being directly north of Parkland.

References

Unincorporated communities in Douglas County, Wisconsin
Unincorporated communities in Wisconsin